The Marasmiaceae are a family of fungi in the order Agaricales. It includes over 50 genera and some 1590 species.

Genera

Notes and references
Notes

References

See also 
 List of Agaricales families
 List of Agaricales genera

.
Marasmiaceae
Marasmiaceae